Alison Mary Fiske (2 August 1943 – 26 July 2020) was an English actress, who won Actress of the Year in a New Play at the 1977 Laurence Olivier Awards for playing Fish in Dusa, Fish, Stats and Vi. She was also nominated in the 1979 Laurence Olivier Awards for Best Actress in a Supporting Role for playing Evie in For Services Rendered, and she won awards for her television performance in Helen: A Woman of Today.

Early life

Fiske was born in Bedford, the daughter of Roger Fiske, a musicologist, and Elizabeth (née Sadler), who had trained as an actress. She was the second of five siblings (Catherine, Veronica, John and Sarah). Fiske began her training with Letty Littlewood at The Associated Arts School in Wimbledon, London for her A-levels, then attended Central School of Speech and Drama in 1963, where she first met her future husband, Stephen Fagan. There was a breakaway group of teachers and students within the Royal Central School, and Fiske and Fagan became founder students of the newly formed Drama Centre.

Professional career

 
In 1965, both Fiske and Fagan joined Theatre Group 20, which was formed by an American drama student, Gordon Taylor, and Shivaun O’Casey. They worked out of a church hall in Warwick Avenue, London and began a 4 month tour of American universities, where they performed in The Beggar's Opera and some of Harold Pinter's plays.

Later in New York in an Off-Broadway performance, they were raided by U.S. Immigration officers because they were on the incorrect U.S visas, as a result, they returned to England. Fiske subsequently joined the newly founded Everyman Theatre, Liverpool in Liverpool.

Fiske's television debut was in a Ken Russell project for the television series Monitor (The Debussy Film: Impressions of the French Composer, 1965), co-written by Melvyn Bragg. Debussy was played by Oliver Reed. Her first major television series was The Roads to Freedom (1970), based on a trilogy of novels by Jean-Paul Sartre, in which she played Ivich.

Fiske joined the Royal Shakespeare Company in 1971, where she would perform in productions of The Merchant of Venice, Much Ado About Nothing, Othello, King John, Twelfth Night and Coriolanus. Her last stage role before she retired was in A Man for All Seasons at the Theatre Royal Haymarket in 2006, and her last television role was in the television series Cold Blood, where she played Barbara Wicklow in 2007 and 2008.

Retirement and death
Fiske retired from acting in 2008 with her husband, to live at their home in Barcombe, East Sussex. She died of cancer in 2020.

Television

Stage

References

External links

1943 births
2020 deaths
Laurence Olivier Award winners
Alumni of the Royal Central School of Speech and Drama
Alumni of the Drama Centre London
20th-century English actresses
English television actresses
English stage actresses
English Shakespearean actresses
English film actresses
Actresses from Bedfordshire
People from Bedford
People from Barcombe